The Angamis are a major Naga ethnic group predominantly inhabiting the Kohima District, Chümoukedima District and Dimapur District in the Northeast Indian state of Nagaland. The Angamis are divided into four regions namely Chakhro Angami, Northern Angami, Southern Angami and Western Angami. The now separated Chakhesangs were previously known as the Eastern Angamis.

Division 
The territory of the Angamis is mostly located in the present Kohima, Chümoukedima and Dimapur District of Nagaland with a part of its territory also lying in the Senapati District of Manipur. The territory is divided into four regions :

Southern Angami 

This region also known as Japfüphiki is bounded on the south by the Mao Nagas, on the southwest by the Maram Nagas, on the west by the Zeliangrongs, on the northwest by the Western Angamis, on the north by the Northern Angamis, on the northeast by the Chokri Chakhesangs and on the southeast by the Khezha Chakhesangs.
 
The urban and rural centres are :
 Viswema, Jakhama, Kigwema, Khuzama, Phesama, Kidima, Mima, Mitelephe, Pfuchama, Kezoma, Kezo Basa, Kezo Town and Sakhabama (formerly Chakhabama).

Western Angami 
This region is bounded by the Zeliangrongs on the west, on the southeast by the Southern Angamis, on the east by the Northern Angamis and on the northwest by the Chakhro Angamis.
 
The urban and rural centres are :
 Khonoma, Jotsoma, Dzüleke, Sechü Zubza, Mezoma, Kiruphema, Peducha, Mengujüma and Thekrejüma.

Northern Angami 
This region is bounded by the Western Angamis on the west, on the south by the Southern Angamis, on the east by the Chakhesang Nagas, the northeast by the Sümi Nagas, on the north by the Rengma Nagas and on the northwest by the Western Sümis.
 
The urban and rural centres are :
 Kohima, Kohima Village, Chiephobozou, Chiechama, Nachama, Tuophema, Zhadima, Kijümetouma, Tsiemekhuma, Chüziema, Chedema, Meriema, Nerhema, Gariphema, Dihoma, Rüsoma, Tsiesema, Tsiesema basa, Seiyhama, Botsa and Phekerkrie.

Chakhro Angami 
Mostly settled in the flatlands around the Districts of Chümoukedima and Dimapur.
 
The urban and rural centres are :
 Chümoukedima, Medziphema, Sovima, Kirha, Tenyiphe I, Tenyiphe II, Virazouma, Vidima, Kuda, Rüzaphema, Pherima, Piphema, Tsiepama, Sirhima, Toulazouma, Phevima, Diphupar and Sodzülhou.

Former Eastern Angami 
The former Eastern Angamis have separated and are now recognised as the Chakhesang Nagas.

Culture 

Traditionally, the Angami Nagas are hill people depending basically on cultivation and livestock-rearing. The Angamis are known for terraced wet-rice cultivation; because of this labor-intensive cultivation, land is the most important form of property among them. They are one of the only two groups of Nagas out of the seventeen who practice wet-rice cultivation on terraces made on the hill slopes. This allows them to cultivate the same plot year after year. They depend, to a very small extent, on slash-and-burn cultivation.

Social stratification is not observed in the Angami community. Traditionally, property was divided equally among sons with daughters also receiving a share; in modern families it is shared among children. The youngest male in the family inherits the parental home, Kithoki, which means he is responsible for their care until they pass away.

Cuisine 
Rice is the staple food of the Angamis. Meat is a common main dish served with boiled vegetables as side dishes.

Galho is a popular Angami cuisine made from a mixture of rice, vegetables and various meats. It uses different kinds of ingredients such as Rice, Chinese knotweed, Pork or Beef, various vegetables and so on.

Religion

Christianity 
The Angami Christians are composed of five major denominations: Baptist, Revival, Roman Catholic, Pentecostal and Seventh-day Adventist. Baptists constitute more than 80% of the total Angami Christian population and all the Baptist churches in their region are under the Angami Baptist Church Council.

Other religions 
Although more than 98% of the Angamis are Christians, they are one of the last Naga ethnic groups having an animist population. The Angami animists practice a religion known as Pfütsana. According to the 1991 census, there were 1,760 Angami practitioners, but 10 years later the figure had halved to 884. Currently there are several hundred adherents of the Pfütsana religion, scattered in nine villages of the Southern Angami region of Kohima District. A religious organization, Japfüphiki Pfütsana, was founded in 1987 to streamline indigenous religious practices among the Angamis. According to the 2011 Census, 98.62% of the Angami are Christian, 0.47% are Buddhist, 0.37% Hindu, 0.24% Muslim and 0.19% Pfütsana.

Festivals

Sekrenyi 

The Angamis celebrate a ten-day festival called Sekrenyi (sometimes also called Phousanyi and Sokre–n in Southern Angami ) in February. The term Sekrenyi literally means sanctification festival ( = sanctification;  = feast;  = festival). The festival takes places after the harvest and falls on the twenty-fifth day of the month Kezei (January–February).

Te–l Khukhu 
 
Te–l Khukhu is a festival that falls on 13th of Chünyi (July). It is a time of giving and sharing of food with each other. This is the only festival dedicated for girls. Gone were the days when different animistic rituals were performed but with the advent of Christianity the rituals were no longer performed. Today it is celebrated as a time of get-togetherness and sharing with the dear and near ones.

Language 

There are several dialects of the Angamis, the most prominent being Khwüno Dialect (around Western Angami area), Kewhi Dialect (in the Northern Angami area) and Viswe Dialect or Keyho Dialect (in the Southern Angami area). Others include Dzu-o, Chakhro, Mima, Nali, Mozome. Tenyidie is the prestige dialect, used for publications and taught in the schools.

Notable people

Gallery

See also 
 Angami Baptist Church Council
 Tati (musical instrument)
 Tenyidie (Angami Language)
 Kohima
 Nagaland

References

Further reading 
 Alban von Stockhausen: Imag(in)ing the Nagas: The Pictorial Ethnography of Hans-Eberhard Kauffmann and Christoph von Fürer-Haimendorf. Arnoldsche, Stuttgart 2014, .
 Durkheim, E. and Mauss, 1963. Primitive Classification. (trans. R. Needham), London, Free Press.
 Edsman, C.M., 1987. ‘Fire’, The Encyclopaedia of Religion, vol. 5, ed. by M. Eliade. pp. 340–46. New York, Macmillan Publishing Company.
 Hutton, J.H., 1969. The Angami Nagas, Bombay, Oxford University Press. (first published in 1921 by Macmillan & Co. London).
 Joshi, Vibha. A Matter of Belief: Christian Conversion and Healing in North-East India (Berghahn Books; 2012) 298 pages; a study of Christian conversion and the revival of traditional animist culture among the Angami Naga.
 Rudhardt, J., 1987. ‘Water’, The Encyclopaedia of Religion, vol. 15, ed. by M. Eliade, pp. 350–61. New York, Macmillan Publishing Company.
Stirn, Aglaja & Peter van Ham. The Hidden world of the Naga: Living Traditions in Northeast India. London: Prestel.
Oppitz, Michael, Thomas Kaiser, Alban von Stockhausen & Marion Wettstein. 2008. Naga Identities: Changing Local Cultures in the Northeast of India. Gent: Snoeck Publishers.
Kunz, Richard & Vibha Joshi. 2008. Naga – A Forgotten Mountain Region Rediscovered. Basel: Merian.
Jonathan Glancey.2011.Nagaland- A journey to India's Forgotten Frontier :Faber and Faber .

External links 

Ethnologue profile
Web India

Ethnic groups in India
Ethnic groups in South Asia
Naga people
Ethnic groups in Northeast India